Ángel Alarcón Galiot (born 15 May 2004) is a Spanish professional footballer currently playing as a forward for FC Barcelona Atlètic.

Club career
Born in Castelldefels, Alarcón started his footballing career at the age of four with amateur side Vista Alegre, where both of his parents played. He joined Barcelona in 2018 from Espanyol, going on to make his debut for the Barcelona Atlètic side in 2021. A ruptured ACL during the semi final of the Copa de Campeones Juvenil de Fútbol saw him miss the entirety of the 2021–22 season.

On 18 January 2023, having scored twelve goals for the club's Juvenil A team, he was named in the Barcelona senior squad for the Copa del Rey game against Ceuta the following day. He made his professional debut as Barcelona went on to beat Ceuta 5–0, coming on as a substitute for Raphinha.

International career
Alarcón has represented Spain at youth international level.

Style of play
A forward comfortable using both feet and able to play anywhere across the front line, Alarcón is known for his pace and goal-scoring ability.

Career statistics

Club

Notes

References

2004 births
Living people
People from Castelldefels
Spanish footballers
Spain youth international footballers
Association football forwards
La Liga players
Segunda División B players
Primera Federación players
FC Barcelona players
FC Barcelona Atlètic players